Farneworth  may refer to:

Ellis Farneworth
Farnworth